Vail Health Hospital is a regional hospital in Vail, Colorado, in Eagle County. Originally established as a small clinic in 1965, the hospital now has 56 beds. The hospital is a Level III trauma center.

History
Vail Health Hospital began as Vail Clinic in 1965 and was staffed by just one doctor, Dr. Tom Steinberg. The first hospital building was constructed in 1967, and it was expanded in 1979. In 1980, the clinic changed its name to Vail Valley Medical Center. By this year, it had 25 full-time doctors on its staff. Major expansions took place in 1987, 1989, and 2001, when Vail Health's Shaw Regional Cancer Center opened. In 2017, Vail Valley Medical Center changed its name to Vail Health, its current name.

2020 expansion
In December 2020, the hospital opened a new, $194 million wing, the East Wing. The new wing features a helipad on the roof, with an elevator that brings patients directly to the emergency department.

Vail Health
The umbrella organization behind Vail Health Hospital is Vail Health, a nonprofit 501(c)(3) organization governed by a board of directors. Vail Health also operates satellite clinics in Eagle and Summit counties. The clinics are located in Avon, Beaver Creek, Breckenridge, Dillon, Eagle, Edwards, Frisco, Gypsum, Leadville, and Silverthorne.

References

External links
Hospital website

Hospitals in Colorado
Buildings and structures in Eagle County, Colorado
Hospitals established in 1965
1965 establishments in Colorado